Jeffcoat is a surname. Notable people with the surname include:

Emma Jeffcoat (born 1994), Australian triathlete
George Jeffcoat (1913–1978), American baseball player
Hal Jeffcoat (1924–2007), American baseball player
Harold George Jeffcoat (born 1947), American academic administrator
Hollis Jeffcoat (1952–2018), American painter
Jackson Jeffcoat (born 1990), American football player
Jan Jeffcoat (born 1980), American television news anchor
Jim Jeffcoat (born 1961), American football player
John Jeffcoat, American film director
Mike Jeffcoat (born 1959), American baseball player
Rupert Jeffcoat (born 1970), Scottish organist

See also
Jeffcott